Tang Tuck Kan<ref name="Tang Tuck Kan Artist" (1934-2012)  is a Malaysian artist. Tang was known in the late 60's and 70's for his abstract expressionism, "Hard Edge" space identity in Malaysian Art World. His iconic masterpiece, "49 Squares" is the permanent collection at the National Art Gallery of Malaysia in Kuala Lumpur. Towards his later year, he fused his "Hard Edge" concept with the Chinese I-Ching philosophy, created a modern art masterpieces inspired by his own cultural root.

In the early years, Tang pursued his Fine Arts education in UK after he was granted the British Commonwealth Fulbright Scholarship. In 1966, Tang graduated from the prestigious Saint Martin's School of Art in London, UK, which is the Central Saint Martins Arts and Design College under the University of Arts in London. At his later age of life, he created new landscape paintings that married the western composition and watercolor technique to ordinary Chinese painting composition. His landscape paintings quickly became popular in the 80's and 90's. Comfortable as a realist, figurative, portraiture and modern artist, he excelled in all given medium as his artistic presentation.

As an Academician, he was once a senior art teacher at St. Johns Institution, Kuala Lumpur; a lecturer at Institut Teknologi MARA (ITM), which later becomes the Universiti Teknologi Mara (UiTM). Among well-known Malaysian artists who once were his students include Ismail Latiff and Anuar Rashid. Throughout his career, he co-founded Malaysian Institute of Art (MIA) and Kuala Lumpur College of Art (KLCA) with a group of Malaysian Chinese artists.

Tang had solo exhibitions in 1971, 1976 and 1977. He was invited to commission an artwork for the 10th São Paulo Art Biennial in Brazil, 1969, Brazil, Expo '70 in Osaka, Japan and several exhibitions in Canada, Australia and New Zealand.

References

External links 
 Muliyadi Mahamood, Modern Malaysian Art: From the Pioneering Era to the Pluralist Era, 1930s-1990s, Utusan Publications, 2007 pp17
 T. K. Sabapathy, Redza Piyadasa, Modern Artists of Malaysia, Dewan Bahasa dan Pustaka, Ministry of Education Malaysia, 1983 pp20, pp38, pp135 
 Vision and Idea: Relooking Modern Malaysian Art, 12 October-12 December 1994 : Exhibition Catalogue, National Art Gallery, 1994 pp36

1934 births
2012 deaths
People from Ipoh
People from Perak
Malaysian artists
20th-century Malaysian artists
Alumni of Saint Martin's School of Art
Cantonese
Malaysian people of Cantonese descent
Malaysian people of Hakka descent